Sutton River may refer to:

Sutton River (Hudson Bay), Kenora District, Ontario, Canada
Sutton River (Missisquoi River tributary), also known as the North Branch Missisquoi River, flowing in Vermont, United States, and Québec, Canada
Sutton River (West Branch Passumpsic River tributary), in Caledonia County, Vermont, United States